This is a list of Category A listed buildings in North Lanarkshire, Scotland.

In Scotland, the term listed building refers to a building or other structure officially designated as being of "special architectural or historic interest".  Category A structures are those considered to be "buildings of national or international importance, either architectural or historic, or fine little-altered examples of some particular period, style or building type." Listing was begun by a provision in the Town and Country Planning (Scotland) Act 1947, and the current legislative basis for listing is the Planning (Listed Buildings and Conservation Areas) (Scotland) Act 1997.  The authority for listing rests with Historic Scotland, an executive agency of the Scottish Government, which inherited this role from the Scottish Development Department in 1991. Once listed, severe restrictions are imposed on the modifications allowed to a building's structure or its fittings. Listed building consent must be obtained from local authorities prior to any alteration to such a structure. There are approximately 47,400 listed buildings in Scotland, of which around 8% (some 3,800) are Category A.

There are ten Category A listed buildings within the area, ranging in age from Dalzell House, which incorporates a 15th-century tower house, to the former Cummins engine factory in Shotts, one of Scotland's youngest listed buildings, having been completed in 1983. It is listed as "one of most significant and important examples of large industrial buildings in later 20th century Britain". Other post-war buildings include two churches by the modernist architecture firm Gillespie, Kidd and Coia. Country houses are represented by William Adam's Cumbernauld House, and James Gillespie Graham's Cambusnethan House. Two urban villas in Dullatur, in the style of Alexander "Greek" Thomson, but probably by his partner Robert Turnbull, also merit Category A status.

List

|}

Notes

References

External links

Category A Listed Buildings in North Lanarkshire at British Listed Buildings

North Lanarkshire
Category A listed buildings in North Lanarkshire